Ksar el Khali is a town in central-northern Mauritania. It is located in the Chinguetti Department in the Adrar Region.

Nearby towns and villages include Jraif (46.2 nm), Chinguetti (51.1 nm), and  Casbah des Ait Maouine (86.5 nm).

External links
Satellite map at Maplandia.com

Populated places in Mauritania
Adrar Region